Annie Ward Mobley is a  Democratic member of the North Carolina House of Representatives, representing the 5th district since her appointment in January 2007.

References

External links
North Carolina General Assembly - Representative Annie W. Mobley
Project Vote Smart - Representative Annie Ward Mobley (NC) profile
Follow the Money - Annie Ward Mobley
2008 campaign contributions

External links

Democratic Party members of the North Carolina House of Representatives
Living people
Women state legislators in North Carolina
1942 births
21st-century American politicians
21st-century American women politicians